Tamworth High School is a government-funded co-educational comprehensive secondary day school, located in Willis Street, South Tamworth, a suburb of the Tamworth Regional Council local government area in the New England region of New South Wales, Australia.

Established in 1919, the school enrolled approximately 670 students in 2018, from Year 7 to Year 12, of whom 31 percent identified as Indigenous Australians and four percent were from a language background other than English. The school is operated by the NSW Department of Education; the principal is Mr Keith Leyshon

School song
(Author not known)

A first year lad knocks at the door
  His eye is clear and bright
With eager heart to play his part
  With all his main and might
To do his best when hardly pressed
  Resolving I must try.

CHORUS 
To add fresh fame unto her name
  And honor Tamworth High
And honor Tamworth High
  We greet our rivals with a cheer, the fight be ever fair,
A lusty band we firmly stand, success our only care.
  We will all be true to the black and blue,
So let the banner fly.

CHORUS 
To add fresh fame unto her name
  And honor Tamworth High
And honor Tamworth High
  The years roll by and all too soon
The school is left behind
  And in the strife of worldly life
Our hopes may all prove blind
  But the place we've earned and the code we've learned
Will not fail us if we try.

CHORUS 
To add fresh fame unto her name
  And honor Tamworth High
And honor Tamworth High.

See also 

 List of government schools in New South Wales
 Schools in Tamworth, New South Wales
 Education in Australia
 Peel High School

References

External links
 

Buildings and structures in Tamworth, New South Wales
Public high schools in New South Wales
Educational institutions established in 1919
1919 establishments in Australia